Umtiza is a monotypic genus in the legume family Fabaceae containing the single species Umtiza listeriana. This tree is endemic to a small coastal portion of the Eastern Cape in South Africa.

Distribution 

Conservation 
In 2020, an area of  surrounding the Umtiza Nature Reserve (one of the last refuges of Umtiza) was declared a Controlled Forest Area to further protect and rehabilitate the remaining Umtiza Forest. Umtiza listeriana is threatened by the expansion of illegal settlements near the Umtiza Forest, leading to deforestation and harvesting for traditional medicine. For these reasons SANBI has given it the conservation classification: Vulnerable B1ab(v).

Gallery

References 

Caesalpinioideae
Monotypic Fabaceae genera
Endemic flora of South Africa
Taxonomy articles created by Polbot